155 West Washington Boulevard is a Romanesque Revival high-rise building built in 1927. It is located in Historic South Central Los Angeles.

References 

1927 establishments in California
Buildings and structures in Los Angeles
South Los Angeles